Jin Yuzhang (born 3 May 1942) is a Chinese civil servant, politician and former nobleman. He is the current head of the House of Aisin-Gioro, the ruling house of the now-defunct Qing dynasty.

His father was Manchu nobleman Jin Youzhi, and he is a nephew of Puyi, the last emperor of the Qing dynasty of China.

Biography
Jin was born in Beijing on 3 May 1942. His father Prince Puren was the youngest brother of Puyi. Puyi was the last emperor of the Qing dynasty and who later became emperor of Manchukuo, a Japanese puppet state in northeastern China.

Jin was educated at China University of Geosciences. After graduation he worked at the Qinghai Bureau of Geology and Mineral Resources from 1968 to 1985, before returning to Beijing to work at the Chongwen district Bureau of Environmental Protection.

Jin is not a member of the Communist Party of China, but has served on various elected assemblies as a non-partisan member. In 1999 he was elected to the Beijing People's Political Consultative Conference. He retired as vice-director of the Chongwen district government in Beijing in 2008.

Personal life 
Jin married an ethnic Han Chinese woman in 1974. The couple has one child, daughter Jin Xin (金鑫), born in 1976.

Ancestry

Patrilineal descent

This patrilineal line shows that Jin Yuzhang was a descendant of rulers of Qing dynasty and ultimately from Odoli tribe. The patrilineal line traced back to Bukūri Yongšon.

Fancha, Million of Woduoli Mansion
Huihou 
Möngke Temür, Chieftain of Jianzhou Jurchens, 1370-1433
Cungšan, Chieftain of Jianzhou Jurchens, 1419-1467
Sibeoci Fiyanggū, Chieftain of Jianzhou Jurchens, d. 1522
Fuman, Chieftain of Jianzhou Jurchens, d. 1542  
Giocangga, Chieftain of Jianzhou Jurchens, 1526–1583
Taksi, Chieftain of Jianzhou Jurchens, 1543-1583
Nurhaci, Khan of Later Jin, 1559–1626
Hong Taiji, Emperor of Qing Dynasty, 1592–1643
Shunzhi, Emperor of Qing Dynasty, 1638–1661
Kangxi, Emperor of Qing Dynasty, 1654–1722
Yongzheng, Emperor of Qing Dynasty, 1678–1735
Qianlong, Emperor of Qing Dynasty, 1711–1799
Jiaqing, Emperor of Qing Dynasty, 1760–1820
Daoguang, Emperor of Qing Dynasty, 1782–1850
Yixuan, Prince Chun of the First Rank, 1840–1891
Zaifeng, Prince Regent of Qing Dynasty, 1883–1951
Jin Youzhi, 1918–2015
Jin Yuzhang, b. 1942

References

1942 births
Living people
Manchu politicians
Aisin Gioro
People's Republic of China politicians from Beijing
Pretenders to the Manchu throne
20th-century Chinese geologists
Qing dynasty imperial princes